Fait-Florian Banser (born 20 February 1982 in Perleberg) is a retired German footballer.

Banser made and scored on his professional debut for Eintracht Braunschweig during the opening round of fixtures of the inaugural 2008–09 3. Fußball-Liga season away to FC Erzgebirge Aue.

After retiring, Banser worked as executive director at VfB Germania Halberstadt until January 2014.

References

External links 
 

1982 births
Living people
People from Perleberg
Footballers from Brandenburg
German footballers
Association football forwards
3. Liga players
1. FC Magdeburg players
VfB Germania Halberstadt players
Eintracht Braunschweig players
1. FC Kaiserslautern II players